The 15th British Academy Video Game Awards was hosted by the British Academy of Film and Television Arts on 4 April 2019 at the Queen Elizabeth Hall in London to honour the best video games of 2018.

Category changes 
For the 15th ceremony, one new category was introduced. The EE Best Mobile Game of the Year Award is similar to the Mobile Game Award but, while the winner of the latter category is voted for by the BAFTA committee, the EE Mobile Game winner is voted for by the British public and the winners receive a special solid yellow BAFTA statuette as opposed to the standard golden statuette given to the winners of the other categories.

Winners and nominees 
The nominations were announced on 14 March 2019. Winners were presented on 4 April 2019.

Games with multiple nominations and wins

Nominations

Wins

References 

British Academy Games Awards ceremonies
British Academy Games
British Academy Games
British Academy Games
Brit